Dragon Girl may refer to:

Dragongirl, a 2010 American science fiction novel by Todd McCaffrey in the Dragonriders of Pern series
St. Dragon Girl, a 1999–2003 Japanese manga by Natsumi Matsumoto
Longnü, an acolyte of the bodhisattva Avalokiteśvara in Chinese Buddhism, daughter of the Dragon King
Xiaolongnü, a fiction character in the 1959–1961 Chinese novel The Return of the Condor Heroes, also translated as "Dragon Girl"